Locastra muscosalis is a species of snout moth in the genus Locastra. It was described by Francis Walker in 1866 and is known from India (including Darjiling) and Sri Lanka.

References

Moths described in 1866
Epipaschiinae
Moths of Japan